The Duchy of Kuyavia was a district principality in the Central Europe, in the region of Kuyavia. Its capital was Inowrocław. It was formed in 1230 from the part of the Duchy of Masovia. In 1231, duchies of Sieradz and Łęczyca, had been formed from the part of the state. The duchy existed until 1367 when it was partitioned between duchies of Inowrocław and Brześć Kujawski. Its only ruler was the duke Casimir I of Kuyavia of the Piast dynasty.

List of rulers 
 Casimir I of Kuyavia (1230–1267)

Citations

Notes

References

Bibliography 
Dariusz Karczewski, Książę Kazimierz Konradowiec i Kujawy jego czasów.
Błażej Śliwiński, Leszek, książe inowrocławski.
Józef Śliwiński, Władysław Biały.
S. Zajączkowski, Studia nad terytorialnym formowaniem ziemi łęczyckiej i sieradzkiej, Łódź, 1951.

Former countries in Europe
Former monarchies of Europe
Duchies of Poland
History of Poland during the Piast dynasty
13th-century establishments in Poland
13th-century disestablishments in Poland
States and territories established in 1230
States and territories disestablished in 1367